The Bell House is a historic house at 303 West Cherry Street in Jonesboro, Arkansas.  It is a two-story wood-frame structure, built in 1895 by J. V. Bell, owner of one of Jonesboro's first bookstores.  The house is an elaborately-decorated Queen Anne Victorian, with an asymmetrical arrangement of projecting bays, gables, and porches.  The front porch has a delicate spindle-work frieze, and is supported by turned columns.  Different types of cut shingles give variety to the wall surfaces.

The house was listed on the National Register of Historic Places in 1976.

See also
National Register of Historic Places listings in Craighead County, Arkansas

References

Houses on the National Register of Historic Places in Arkansas
Queen Anne architecture in Arkansas
Houses completed in 1903
Houses in Craighead County, Arkansas
National Register of Historic Places in Craighead County, Arkansas
Buildings and structures in Jonesboro, Arkansas